Hillingsø is a surname. Notable people with the surname include:

Birgitta Hillingsø (born 1940), Danish antiques dealer
Ellen Hillingsø (born 1967), Danish actress
Kjeld Hillingsø (born 1935), Danish general
Lars Hillingsø (1938–2005), Danish fashion designer